Karalat is a rural locality (a selo) and the administrative center of Karalatsky Selsoviet, Kamyzyaksky District, Astrakhan Oblast, Russia. The population was 1,156 as of 2010. There are 24 streets.

Geography 
Karalat is located 34 km southeast of Kamyzyak (the district's administrative centre) by road. Chapayevo and Parygino are the nearest rural localities.

References 

Rural localities in Kamyzyaksky District